Titulus, the Latin word for "title", "label" or "inscription" (plural tituli, normally italicized), may or may not be italicized as a foreign word, and may refer to:
 Titulus, or Titular church, one of a group of Early Christian churches around the edges of Rome
 Titulus (inscription), a caption, title or other inscription, especially an Ancient Roman type, and a "caption" name in an artwork

See also
 Titulus Crucis, a claimed relic of the INRI inscription on the cross of Jesus
 Titulus pictus, amphorae inscriptions
 Titulus Regius or Titulus Regis, literally the royal title, the name of a parliamentary decree giving Richard III the throne